Meerut district is an education hub in western Uttar Pradesh, India. It has 4 universities, 80 technical-professional colleges, 150 academic colleges, and 2 medical colleges. The district also has over 380 schools.

Universities
Meerut has two State universities, three private university and one deemed university:

Colleges affiliated to Dr. A.P.J. Abdul Kalam Technical University
All professional education in the city comes under the jurisdiction of Dr. A.P.J. Abdul Kalam Technical University, Lucknow. Hence, all colleges offering engineering, pharmacy, hotel management and fashion design are affiliated to it.

Engineering
The district has only Government engineering college which name is Sir Chhoturam Institute Of Engineering and Technology affiliated with Meerut University and  34 engineering colleges affiliated to Mahamaya Technical University. The following table lists the branches of engineering each institute offers in bachelors courses. Many of these colleges, along with various streams of engineering, also offer MBA and MCA courses.

Pharmacy
The following colleges offer a 4-year Bachelor of Pharmacy degree course:
 Bharat Institute of Technology

Colleges affiliated to Chaudhary Charan Singh University

Constituent College
Sir Chhotu Ram Institute of Engineering and Technology is the constituent college of the university. It was established in July 2002  and is the only engineering college in the city which is Government and not affiliated to Mahamaya Technical University. It offers Bachelor of Technology programs in 13 streams. It is also the mother institute of the National Agriculture Institute, the Government Central food Institute. Autonomous status has been granted to the institute by the Government.

Infrastructure 
The institute is spread across two campuses, the east campus (77 acres) and the west campus (271 acres) situated 3 km apart.
Facilities are provided for cricket, volleyball, table tennis, lawn tennis, football, basketball, badminton, baseball, and general physical fitness (gymnasium).

Programs 
B.Tech. (Bachelor of Technology) courses are offered in 13 fields of engineering and technology and all have been accredited by the National Board of Accreditation (NBA)
 Chemical Engineering
 Electronics Engineering
 Mechanical Engineering
 Computer Science and Engineering
 Information Technology
 Food Technology
 Agriculture engineering
 Civil Engineering
 Electrical engineering

Govt and Aided Colleges
The city has the following govt owned or aided colleges running affiliated to Chaudhary Charan Singh University.

Medical Colleges
The city has the following medical colleges:

Schools
Meerut has innumerable schools. The schools in the city are affiliated to either the CBSE, IB, ICSE, NIOS, or UP Board.

CBSE
 Army Public School, Meerut Cantt
 BNG International School, Kila Road, Meerut
 Shanti niketan vidyapeeth, 6 milestone mawana road, Meerut 
 K.L. International School, Somdutt Vihar, Meerut
 Dewan Public School, Meerut Westend Road, Meerut
Dayawati Modi Academy, Modipuram, Meerut
 Vidya Global school, Meerut baghpat Road
 City Vocational Public School, Meerut Cantonment
 St. John's Senior Secondary School, Meerut Cantonment
 Vardhman Academy, Railway Road
 GTB, Guru Tegh Bhadur Public School Meerut Cantonment
 Darshan Academy West End Road, Meerut Cantt
 St. Peter's Academy Kankerkhera, Meerut, Meerut
Ashoka Academy, Kankerkhera, Meerut

IB
 Vidya Global School, Meerut

ICSE
 St. Mary's Academy
 St. Thomas English Medium School
   Sophia Girls’ School
Other Institutes:

NEET-UG preparation Institute

Allele Institute For Medical Entrance (AIME), Meerut

Institutes 

 Digital Rudhra, IT Training Institute

See also
 List of colleges affiliated with Mahamaya Technical University
 Education in Uttar Pradesh

References

External links
 

Meerut
Education in Meerut
Universities and colleges in Uttar Pradesh by district